Good Feelin' (stylised as ...good feelin'...) is an album by blues guitarist/vocalist T-Bone Walker recorded in Paris in 1968 and released by the Polydor label in 1969. The album received a Grammy for “Best Ethnic or Traditional Recording” in 1970, and it was reissued on CD by Sunnyside Records in 2007

Reception

AllMusic reviewer arwulf arwulf stated: "Recorded in Paris during November 1968, Good Feelin' was the album that rekindled public interest in the life and music of Aaron "T-Bone" Walker throughout Europe and even in some portions of the United States of America. ... With T-Bone's electric guitar sizzling in its own juice and the horns signifying together over soulful organ grooves and freshly ground basslines, all of this music is rich and powerful".

Track listing
All compositions by Aaron Walker except where noted
 "Good Feelin (Walker, Robin Hemingway) – 1:31
 "Every Day I Have the Blues" (Peter Chatman) – 2:48
 "Woman You Must Be Crazy" – 6:17
 "Long Lost Lover" – 2:56
 "I Wonder Why" – 4:15
 "Vacation" – 3:05
 "Shake It Baby" – 3:37
 "Poontang" (Walker, Hemingway) –2:49
 "Reconsider" – 4:44
 "Sail On Little Girl" – 2:46
 "When I Grow Up" – 3:15
 "See You Next Time" (Walker, Hemingway) – 1:01

Personnel
T-Bone Walker – guitar, piano vocals
unidentified musician – trumpet
Francis Cournet, Pierre Holassian – saxophone
Manu Dibango – saxophone, piano, organ
Michel Sardaby – piano
Bernard Estardy – piano, organ, percussion
Slim Pezin – guitar
Jeannot Karl – bass
Lucien Dobat – drums
Earl Lett, Jean-Louis Proust – percussion

References

T-Bone Walker albums
1969 albums
Polydor Records albums
Sunnyside Records albums